Michael Stanhope DD (1681-1737) was a Canon of Windsor from 1730 to 1737

Early life
Stanhope was educated at Corpus Christi College, Cambridge and graduated BA in 1702, MA in 1705, and DD in 1717. He married  Penelope Lovell, daughter of Sir Salathiel Lovell.

Career
Stanope was appointed:
Prebendary of Oxgate in St Paul's 1711 - 1737
Rector of St Mary's Church, East Leake 1717 
Stanhope was appointed to the sixth stall in St George's Chapel, Windsor Castle in 1730 and held the canonry until 1737.

Later years and legacy
Stanhope died in about 1737. He had four sons
Arthur Charles Stanhope (1715-1770)
Sir Thomas Stanhope (1717-1770)
Ferdinand Stanhope (1718-1790)
His youngest son Lovell Stanhope (1720-1783) was a lawyer, administrator and politician.

Notes 

1737 deaths
Canons of Windsor
Alumni of Corpus Christi College, Cambridge
Year of birth unknown